Silene clokeyi, known as Clokey's catchfly, is a species of flowering plant in the pink family. It is native to western North America.

Distribution and habitat
Clokey's catchfly is a rare species, endemic to the Spring Mountains in Clark County, Nevada. It is threatened by foot traffic, invasive species, and horticultural exploitation.

References

clokeyi
Flora of North America